Sheikh Hamdan bin Mohammed bin Rashid Al Maktoum (born 14 November 1982) is an Emirati royal and politician who has been the Crown Prince of Dubai since 2008. He previously served as deputy ruler of Dubai from 2006 to 2008. He is popularly known as Fazza, the name under which he publishes his poetry, which means "the one who helps" in Arabic. As an equestrian, Maktoum is a multiple world champion at the World Equestrian Games.

Early life and education
Hamdan bin Mohammed is the son of Sheikh Mohammed bin Rashid Al Maktoum and Sheikha Hind bint Maktoum bin Juma Al Maktoum, the senior wife of Mohammed. He is the second son of their 12 children and the fourth of his father's children (He is the third son of his father). Hamdan's elder full brother was Sheikh Rashid bin Mohammed.

Hamdan bin Mohammed was educated in Dubai at the Rashid School For Boys and then at the Dubai School of Government. He continued his studies in the United Kingdom, where he graduated from Sandhurst in 2001; he later attended the London School of Economics. In his interview with Vision he described how Sandhurst taught him the importance of self-discipline, commitment, virtue, responsibility, endurance, understanding, teamwork, friendship and the benefits of hard work.

Roles and positions
Hamdan bin Mohammed was appointed as the Chairman of the Dubai executive council in September 2006. On 1 February 2008, he was appointed Crown Prince of Dubai, while his brother Sheikh Maktoum bin Mohammed Al Maktoum acceded to Deputy Ruler of Dubai. As the new hereditary prince, Maktoum appointed new key personnel and financial advisors such as economist John Calverly and hedge fund personality James T. Naeem, while Maktoum himself became head of HN Capital LLP. He is the head of the Sheikh Mohammed bin Rashid Establishment for young entrepreneurs; he sits on the Dubai sports council and the Dubai autism centre.

He was part of the Dubai World Expo 2020 delegation when the emirate was awarded the rights to host the event. He went to the top floor of the Burj Khalifa to wave the UAE flag a few days after the World Expo 2020 win. He is the founder of the Hamdan International Photography Award, which was launched in 2011.

In June 2022, Sheikh Hamdan launched the "Dubai Global" initiative, which was meant to establish 50 commercial representative offices for Dubai in five continents across the world. The initiative was to support Dubai-based firms and to strengthen the city's position as a business hub.

Personal interests
The Crown Prince's Instagram account has more than 15 million followers, as of November 2022. He posts pictures that showcase his hobbies, which include animals, poetry, sports, photography and adventures.

Hamdan Al Maktoum is a licensed equestrian, sky diver and scuba diver. He dives in Fujairah. He is known for his romantic and patriotic poems in Arabic. He publishes his poems under the pen name of Fazza (فزاع). He rides for Godolphin Stables and has attended the Royal Ascot.

Sheikh Hamdan won a gold medal at the Alltech FEI World Equestrian Games™ 2014 in Normandy (FRA), team gold in 2012 and a bronze medal in 2010. He led a team of five UAE riders at Championships in Samorín on 17 September 2016.

Personal life
On 15 May 2019, Hamdan married Sheikha Shaikha bint Saeed bin Thani Al Maktoum.  On the same day, his brothers, Maktoum and Ahmad, also got married. On 6 June 2019, he and his brothers celebrated the royal weddings together at the Dubai World Trade Centre. 

On 21 May 2021, it was announced that Sheikh Hamdan had welcomed twins, a son named Rashid and a daughter named Shaikha. On 25 February 2023, Sheikh Hamdan and Sheikha Shaikha welcomed a son, named Mohammed bin Hamdan Al Maktoum.

Honours 
  Knight Grand Cross of the Order of Civil Merit (Kingdom of Spain, 23 May 2008)

References

External links

Official Website - Arabic
Official Website - English

20th-century Emirati poets
21st-century Emirati poets
1982 births
Alumni of the London School of Economics
Emirati businesspeople
Emirati male equestrians
Emirati princes
Graduates of the Royal Military Academy Sandhurst
Grand Cross of the Order of Civil Merit
Heads of universities in the United Arab Emirates
Heirs apparent
Living people
Hamdan
Mohammed bin Rashid School of Government alumni
Asian Games gold medalists for the United Arab Emirates
Medalists at the 2006 Asian Games
Asian Games medalists in equestrian
Equestrians at the 2006 Asian Games
People from Dubai
Rashid School for Boys alumni
Sons of monarchs